Libor Pivko (born March 29, 1980) is a Czech former professional ice hockey left winger. He was drafted in the third round, 89th overall, by the Nashville Predators in the 2000 NHL Entry Draft. He played one game in the National Hockey League with the Predators in the 2003–04 season, on November 24, 2003 against the Colorado Avalanche. The rest of his career, which lasted from 1998 to 2015, was mainly spent in the Czech Extraliga.

Career statistics

Regular season and playoffs

International

See also
 List of players who played only one game in the NHL

External links

 

1980 births
Living people
Czech ice hockey left wingers
HC Dinamo Minsk players
HC Dynamo Pardubice players
HC Havířov players
HC Kometa Brno players
HC Neftekhimik Nizhnekamsk players
HC Slezan Opava players
HK Gomel players
Milwaukee Admirals players
Nashville Predators draft picks
Nashville Predators players
PSG Berani Zlín players
Sportspeople from Nový Jičín
Czech expatriate ice hockey players in Russia
Czech expatriate ice hockey players in the United States
Czech expatriate sportspeople in Belarus
Expatriate ice hockey players in Belarus